M3 was a Canadian English language Category A cable and satellite specialty channel owned by Bell Media.  Established in 1998 as MuchMoreMusic, the network began as a spin-off of the youth-oriented MuchMusic, targeting an older demographic with adult contemporary and classic music videos, along with music news programs, concert specials, and pop culture programming (usually sourced from the U.S. network VH1, which shared a similar positioning).

Under Bell ownership and its final branding as M3, and following the lead of its parent network, the channel adopted a general entertainment format and largely phased out its remaining music programming. On September 1, 2016, M3 was shut down and replaced under its license and most channel allotments by Gusto.

History
In June 1993, the Canadian Radio-television and Telecommunications Commission (CRTC) began accepting licence applications for new Canadian specialty channels for the first time since 1987. On August 31, 1993, MuchMusic and CITY-TV co-founder Moses Znaimer announced on-air a proposal by CHUM Limited to launch a specialty channel called MuchMoreMusic as an adult music/lifestyle channel, quoted as offering music more "familiar, tuneful, [and] melodic" for an audience who "could do with a little less rock and rap and metal". This followed CHUM's earlier application for a country music channel, MuchCountry. "Melodic pop, soft rock, jazz, soul and blues" were to be some of the genres played by MuchMoreMusic; according to CHUM, the new channel would be able to provide such music to the "sizable" portion of its existing audience who enjoyed such softer music but could not find it reliably on MuchMusic.

At a subsequent February 1994 public hearing, the CRTC reviewed a total of seven applications for music channels, comprising five country music channels, MuchMoreMusic, and CHUM's MusiquExtra, which was to be a French-language adult contemporary counterpart. In a Canadian Press article, commissioner Adrian Burns noted concerns with giving one operator control of multiple music channels; Znaimer, meanwhile, claimed that there was no room for more than one operator of music channels in Canada. In June, the MuchMoreMusic application was denied by the Commission, as well as the MuchCountry and MusiquExtra proposals; out of the seven, the only application approved was Maclean-Hunter and Rawlco Communications' The Country Network (which launched as New Country Network, and later became CMT). Subsequently, the CRTC was criticized for passing only 10 of the 48 total applications.

In January 1996, the next round of licensing began, drawing another 44 applications; CHUM submitted nine of these, including MuchMoreMusic and the French-language adult contemporary channel, now called MusiMax (formerly MusicMax). The new application, delivered by MuchMusic programmer Denise Donlon on May 8, 1996, incorporated video testimonials by a number of Canadian musicians, including Anne Murray, Bruce Cockburn, Burton Cummings, Celine Dion, David Foster, Lawrence Gowan, Dan Hill and Marc Jordan, attesting to the need for the channel; Donlon conceded, in a Canadian Press article, that a number of Canadian musicians were no longer filming music videos because MuchMusic was not able to accommodate every music genre equally. On the same day, CHUM also made pitches for Canadian Learning Television and Computer Access, a later rejected computer education channel.

MuchMoreMusic was licensed by the CRTC in 1996 (as well as some of CHUM's other proposals rejected in 1994, including CablePulse24, Space, and Musimax); the channel was launched on October 5, 1998 under the ownership of CHUM Limited.

In January 1999, Globe and Mail critic John Doyle commented on the channel's invariant hosting at the time, remarking that it "appears to be staffed by one person only, Jana Lynne White. The woman does everything — interviews, running down the appalling video chart, promos, everything except come to your house and turn on the TV for you." The channel's early lineup also included the MuchMusic program ClipTrip, which was moved to MuchMoreMusic, along with its host Diego Fuentes, the winner of MuchMusic's 1995 VJ search. In May 2000, Bill Welychka also transferred from MuchMusic, to host Freshly Pressed and later The Loop. In April 2000, full-time staff and programming was expanded, including daytime "information segments". Studio space, at 299 Queen Street West, was shared with MuchMusic until May 2000, when it was moved to the fourth floor of the building. In September 2003, MuchMoreMusic launched a sister digital network, MuchMoreRetro, which focuses exclusively on classic music videos.

On June 22, 2007, CTVglobemedia gained control of MuchMoreMusic as a result of a takeover of CHUM Limited. On March 31, 2009, MuchMoreMusic was relaunched with a new on-air format and subsequently was renamed MuchMore. The changeover took effect at 6:00 a.m. Eastern Time, with the first edition of the newly branded morning video flow series Juiced! Ownership changed hands once again when Bell Canada gained 100% control of CTVglobemedia's assets, including MuchMore, resulting in MuchMore being taken over by Bell Media on April 1, 2011.

As M3
On September 19, 2013, Bell announced that MuchMore would be relaunched as M3 on September 30, shifting towards an entertainment-oriented "superstation" format with a focus on newly-acquired dramas and comedies alongside music programming. Unlike MuchMore, which was marketed as a spin-off of MuchMusic, M3 was marketed as a separate brand to quell concerns over viewers incorrectly suggesting that the network was catered towards a youth demographic due to its similar name. A high definition feed was also launched.

After the relaunch, MuchMoreRetro was rebranded as MuchRetro, aligning the channel with the Much brand. The MuchMore Countdown became the M3 Countdown and was relaunched with a new format on January 18, 2014. It was the last remaining original music-related program on the network. Juiced was cancelled following the rebrand and M3Top20.ca (formerly known as MMMTop20.ca and, later, MMTop20.ca), a viewer-voted countdown show, was removed from the schedule in the spring of 2014.

On September 7, 2014, M3 debuted a new countdown show called the Retro 30. Replacing the M3 Countdown, Retro 30 focuses on "the biggest news, events and artists of a specific day of a year". Following its introduction, the network began adding more retro videos into its rotation. In January 2015, M3 debuted a new country music block: the M3 Country Brunch. Retro 30 was cancelled in 2015 and the Country Brunch block was later removed from the schedule.

On September 1, 2016, M3 was replaced on its CRTC license and channel allotments by Gusto, a food and lifestyle-oriented network. A prior incarnation of the network was operated by Knight Enterprises under a Category B license; the company sold the Canadian rights to the Gusto brand and programming to Bell Media, and the channel was taken over by Bell Media via M3's license.

Programming

Programming on M3 primarily consisted of dramas, sitcoms, reality shows, and theatrically-released films. M3 often carried same-week encores of programming aired on CTV and CTV Two, as well as off-network repeats of shows that aired on other Bell Media-owned channels.

Music videos were broadcast from 6:00 a.m to 3:00 p.m ET on weekdays, and 6:00 a.m to 10:00 a.m ET on weekends. Originally, the channel's music content was aligned towards lighter genres of music. Under the MuchMore branding, the channel began airing a more pop-driven rotation of videos.

As noted before, M3 was marketed as a "superstation" and a separate channel from Much. Though both channels had diverged from their original purpose, Much still retained its music-based format while expanding to focus on pop culture and adopting more younger-skewing programming (The music-based format has since been removed, as Much eventually changed its demographic to male).

Notable former personalities 
 Matt Wells
 Karen Bertelsen
 Diego Fuentes
 Bill Welychka

References

Music video networks in Canada
1998 establishments in Canada
2016 disestablishments in Canada
Former Bell Media networks
Much (TV channel)
Analog cable television networks in Canada
Defunct television networks in Canada
English-language television stations in Canada
Television channels and stations disestablished in 2016
Television channels and stations established in 1998